M. concinna may refer to:

 Macrozamia concinna, an Australian plant
 Melaleuca concinna, an Oceanian myrtle
 Mitra concinna, a sea snail
 Monistria concinna, a gaudy grasshopper
 Montereina concinna, a sea slug
 Mordellistena concinna, a tumbling flower beetle